Macromphalina harryleei is a species of very small sea snail, a marine gastropod mollusk in the family Vanikoridae. It is named for shell collector Harry Lee.

References

Vanikoridae
Gastropods described in 1998